Leora Bettison Robinson (Bettison; June 8, 1840 – January 19, 1914) was an American author and educator of the long nineteenth century. Together with her husband, she established the Holyoke Academy of Louisville, Kentucky. She was the author of The House With Spectacles, Than, Patsy, and other works.

Early life and education
Leora Bettison was born in Little Rock, Arkansas, June 8, 1840. Her parents, Dr. Joseph R. Bettison and Ann Eliza Cathcart, moved to Louisville, Kentucky, before she was a year old. The Bettisons were of distinguished Huguenot lineage, being descended from Pierre Robert, of South Carolina. Bettison's family belong to the Cathcarts of Glasgow, Scotland, who, before coming to America in the seventeenth century, had settled in County Antrim, Ireland. Dr. Bettison was a surgeon in the Confederate States Army. Leora was the sixth of eleven children. 

In her classes, Robinson's writings attracted attention, and many of her early efforts were published in the local papers.  

She was brought up and educated in private and public schools of Louisville, being a member of the first graduating class of the girls' high school of that city in June, 1858. In speaking of her graduating essay, entitled "A Farewell From the Other End of the Class", George D. Prentice, editor of the Louisville Journal (now, The Courier-Journal ), said: "Miss Bettison is a genius, and she will, if she makes the effort, render this manifest to the world". He also paid her a signal compliment in publishing her essay entire in the Journal.

Career
Since the age of sixteen, her life was devoted to educational work, starting as a teacher in the Louisville high school.

On June 29, 1864, she married Prof. Norman Robinson, a graduate of Rochester University. The couple had one child, Jeannette Cathcart.

Prof. and Mrs. Robinson established in Louisville a flourishing school, named Holyoke Academy. During that time, she wrote her earliest books, Than (New York, 1877), a sequel to The House With Spectacles, and Patsy (New York, 1878). 

Owing to an accumulation of business interests by Prof. Robinson in Florida, they moved to that State in 1880, and resided in the capital, Tallahassee while he held the office of State chemist  During the terms of office in which Dr. Robinson was the state chemist of Florida, Mrs. Robinson often assisted him in his laboratory work.

In Tallahassee, Mrs. Robinson did the best literary work of her life. In addition to writing books, she also contributed many strong articles to some of the leading magazines. As Florida correspondent of Home and Farm, she was widely known, and through her long series of truthful articles, entitled "Living in Florida", she was the means of influencing great numbers of people to settle permanently in the state. 

For the last few years before her death, she was recognized as one of Florida's great educators. She kept abreast of the times in all things educational and found peculiar pleasure in reading the classics, in doing special literary work, and using her influence for the betterment of city government. Two years before her death, a strong article she wrote, entitled "Public Schools Remodeled", was widely copied in the Florida press.

She advocated for years the publishing of all tax assessments and the taxing of all church property throughout the United States. She was a firm believer in woman's suffrage, but during the last few years of her life, she repeatedly said that she hoped the day would never come when women would gain the vote.

While living in Louisville, she was a member of the Broadway Baptist Church; while in Florida, she belonged to the First Baptist Church of Orlando.

Death and legacy
After an illness of only a few hours duration, Leora Bettison Robinson died on January 19, 1914. 

Lake Leora in Florida was named in her honor.

Selected works

Books
 Than (New York, 1877)
 The House With Spectacles
 Patsy

Articles
 "Secrets of Home Breadmaking"
 "The Rich Goose"

References

External links
 

1840 births
1914 deaths
Writers from Little Rock, Arkansas
Educators from Arkansas
School founders
People from Tallahassee, Florida
19th-century American writers
19th-century American women writers
20th-century American writers
20th-century American women writers
Wikipedia articles incorporating text from A Woman of the Century